Valdevacas y Guijar is a municipality located in the province of Segovia, Castile and León, Spain. According to the 2004 census (INE), the municipality has a population of 139 inhabitants.

Background 
This little village in the Sierra Nevada foothills is actually two towns: El Guijar, where the municipality's Town Hall is located, and Valdevacas. They constitute what was once known as Guijar de Valdevacas, but is now officially known as Valdevacas and Guijar.

References 

Municipalities in the Province of Segovia